WRIC-FM is a hot adult contemporary formatted broadcast radio station licensed to Richlands, Virginia, serving the Richlands/Grundy/Lebanon area. WRIC-FM is owned and operated by RR & WT Broadcasting, Inc.

History

WRIC-FM was originally on 100.7 FM, but switched frequencies with sister station WMJD in Grundy, Virginia, in 2005.

The WRIC calls were originally parked at AM 540 in Richlands, now WGTH.

In April 2009, WRIC-FM began simulcasting WSTG, located in Princeton, West Virginia, which carries a hot adult contemporary format. Around the same time, WRIC-FM's ownership changed from Peggy Sue Broadcasting Corporation to RR & WT Broadcasting, Inc.

WRIC is not related to WRIC-TV in Richmond.

References

External links
Star 95 Online
facebook.com/star959/

RIC-FM
Radio stations established in 1991
Adult hits radio stations in the United States
1991 establishments in Virginia